The 2002 PowerHouse UK Championship was a professional ranking snooker tournament that took place at the Barbican Centre in York, England. The event started on 1 December 2002 and the televised stages were shown on BBC between 7 and 15 December 2002. The sponsor for this year's event was Powerhouse.

Ronnie O'Sullivan was the defending champion, but he lost in the quarter-finals to Drew Henry.

Mark Williams won his second UK title in a classic 10–9 victory against Ken Doherty, who had reached his second UK final in a row. The highest break of the tournament was 142 made by Ronnie O'Sullivan.

Tournament summary 
2001 champion Ronnie O'Sullivan was the number 1 seed with World Champion Peter Ebdon seeded 2. The remaining places were allocated to players based on the world rankings.

Prize fund
The breakdown of prize money for this year is shown below: 

Winner: £100,000
Runner-up: £54,000
Semi-final: £27,250
Quarter-final: £14,500
Last 16: £11,500
Last 32: £9,200
Last 48: £5,200
Last 64: £4,175

Last 80: £2,950
Last 96: £2,000

Stage one highest break: £2,000
Stage two highest break: £10,000

Stage one maximum break: £5,000
Stage two maximum break: £25,000

Total: £746,900

Main draw

Final

Century breaks

References

2002
UK Championship
Championship (snooker)
UK Championship